Holdens Bay is an eastern suburb of Rotorua in the Bay of Plenty region of New Zealand's North Island.

Demographics
Holdens Bay is in four SA1 statistical areas which cover . The SA1 areas are part of the Holdens Bay-Rotokawa statistical area.

Holdens Bay had a population of 534 at the 2018 New Zealand census, an increase of 12 people (2.3%) since the 2013 census, and an increase of 36 people (7.2%) since the 2006 census. There were 207 households, comprising 258 males and 282 females, giving a sex ratio of 0.91 males per female, with 120 people (22.5%) aged under 15 years, 105 (19.7%) aged 15 to 29, 228 (42.7%) aged 30 to 64, and 84 (15.7%) aged 65 or older.

Ethnicities were 76.4% European/Pākehā, 37.6% Māori, 7.3% Pacific peoples, and 6.2% Asian. People may identify with more than one ethnicity.

Although some people chose not to answer the census's question about religious affiliation, 50.0% had no religion, 38.2% were Christian, 2.8% had Māori religious beliefs, 0.6% were Hindu, 0.6% were Buddhist and 0.6% had other religions.

Of those at least 15 years old, 57 (13.8%) people had a bachelor's or higher degree, and 78 (18.8%) people had no formal qualifications. 57 people (13.8%) earned over $70,000 compared to 17.2% nationally. The employment status of those at least 15 was that 216 (52.2%) people were employed full-time, 63 (15.2%) were part-time, and 24 (5.8%) were unemployed.

Holdens Bay-Rotokawa statistical area

Holdens Bay-Rotokawa had a population of 1,248 at the 2018 New Zealand census, an increase of 84 people (7.2%) since the 2013 census, and a decrease of 9 people (−0.7%) since the 2006 census. There were 462 households, comprising 615 males and 636 females, giving a sex ratio of 0.97 males per female. The median age was 36.6 years (compared with 37.4 years nationally), with 279 people (22.4%) aged under 15 years, 234 (18.8%) aged 15 to 29, 579 (46.4%) aged 30 to 64, and 153 (12.3%) aged 65 or older.

Ethnicities were 67.5% European/Pākehā, 45.2% Māori, 7.7% Pacific peoples, 5.3% Asian, and 1.4% other ethnicities. People may identify with more than one ethnicity.

The percentage of people born overseas was 16.6, compared with 27.1% nationally.

Although some people chose not to answer the census's question about religious affiliation, 49.0% had no religion, 36.8% were Christian, 3.4% had Māori religious beliefs, 1.2% were Hindu, 0.2% were Buddhist and 1.9% had other religions.

Of those at least 15 years old, 147 (15.2%) people had a bachelor's or higher degree, and 177 (18.3%) people had no formal qualifications. The median income was $29,800, compared with $31,800 nationally. 126 people (13.0%) earned over $70,000 compared to 17.2% nationally. The employment status of those at least 15 was that 483 (49.8%) people were employed full-time, 162 (16.7%) were part-time, and 66 (6.8%) were unemployed.

Education
Rotokawa Maori School, opened 1926, was a predecessor.

References

Suburbs of Rotorua
Populated places in the Bay of Plenty Region
Populated places on Lake Rotorua